R. H. Bradley was a member of the Wisconsin State Assembly.

Biography
Bradley was born near Toronto, Ontario on December 12, 1873. His jobs would include being employed by the Chicago, St. Paul, Minneapolis and Omaha Railway and the Wisconsin Central Railway.

Political career
Bradley was a member of the Assembly during the 1917 session. He was a Republican.

References

Politicians from Toronto
Canadian emigrants to the United States
Republican Party members of the Wisconsin State Assembly
1873 births
Year of death missing